AG Pegasi is a symbiotic binary star in the constellation Pegasus. It is a close binary composed of a red giant and white dwarf, estimated to be around 2.5 and 0.6 times the mass of the Sun respectively. It is classified as a symbiotic nova; it has undergone one extremely slow nova outburst and a smaller outburst.

Initially a magnitude 9 star, AG Pegasi brightened and peaked at an apparent magnitude of 6.0 around 1885 before gradually fading to magnitude 9 in the late 20th century. Its spectrum was noted by earlier observers to resemble P Cygni. The spectrum of the hotter star has changed drastically over 160 years, leading investigators Scott Kenyon and colleagues to surmise that its hotter component, originally a white dwarf, accumulated enough material from the donor giant star to begin burning hydrogen and enlarge and brighten into an A-type white supergiant around 1850. It had this spectrum and an estimated surface temperature of around 10000 K in 1900, with a likely radius 16 times that of the Sun, before becoming a B-class star in 1920, then an O-class star in 1940, and finally a Wolf-Rayet star in 1970, with a surface temperature of 95000 K since 1978. It has shrunk to star with a diameter 1.1 times that of the Sun in 1949, then 0.15 times in 1978 and 0.08 times that of the Sun in 1990. AG Pegasi has been described as the slowest nova ever recorded, with a constant bolometric luminosity of the hotter star over 130 years from 1850 to 1980. By the late 20th century, the hotter star has evolved into a hot subdwarf on its way to eventually returning to white dwarf status.

Vogel and colleagues calculated the hotter star must have been accreting material from the red giant for around 5000 years before erupting. Both stars are ejecting material in stellar winds. The resulting nebula contains material from both stars and is complex in nature.

From 1997 until 2015, AG Pegasi entered a quiescent phase with no further change to its brightness.  Then the hot component increased in temperature, which caused the nebulosity around the stars to become more ionised and increase in brightness.  The combination of the extremely slow nova and smaller outburst means that AG Pegasi is classed as a symbiotic nova.

References

M-type giants
Symbiotic novae
Wolf–Rayet stars
Pegasus (constellation)
BD+11 4673
207757
107848
Pegasi, AG